Ilanit Ben-Yaakov (born March 20, 1973) is an Israeli actress.

Biography 
Ilanit Ben-Yaakov was born on March 20, 1973 in Beersheba.  In 1997, she started studying at the School of Visual Theater in Jerusalem. She had her first lead role in the 2002 film Was Great. She has played a number of supporting roles in Israeli films and television series.

Filmography

References

External links 
 

Israeli film actresses
Israeli television actresses
Jewish Israeli actresses
Living people
1973 births
21st-century Israeli actresses
Actors from Beersheba